Gavin Crawford (born 2 April 1971) is a Canadian comedian and actor, best known for The Gavin Crawford Show and This Hour Has 22 Minutes. He currently hosts the panel show, Because News, on CBC Radio One.

Early life
Crawford was born in Taber, Alberta, Canada. He is a graduate of the BFA Acting Program at the University of British Columbia.

Career
An alumnus of The Second City's Toronto company, Crawford is the creator, co-writer and co-star of the self-titled series, which ran for three seasons on The Comedy Network. In 2000 and 2001, he was also a cast member of the short-lived American sketch series Hype. In 2003 he joined the cast of This Hour Has 22 Minutes, filling in for Mary Walsh during her time away from the show.  In 2004, Crawford was made a full-time cast member of This Hour Has 22 Minutes.

Crawford hosted the 2008 Canadian Screenwriting Awards and the Canadian version of How Do You Solve a Problem Like Maria?, which aired on CBC Television in the summer of 2008.  Additionally, Crawford performed in guest appearances on Murdoch Mysteries, Made in Canada, Heartland, The Red Green Show and Corner Gas, and in the film French Immersion.

In 2013, Crawford participated in Salvatore Antonio's Truth/Dare: A Satire (With Dance), an interactive audience participation show which featured staged reenactments of scenes from Madonna's 1991 film Truth or Dare, at Buddies in Bad Times during Toronto's Pride Week. The show's cast also included Keith Cole and Adamo Ruggiero.

In 2014, he starred in Maureen Bradley's film Two 4 One as Adam, a trans man who winds up unexpectedly pregnant, and in the sitcom 24 Hour Rental as J.R.

Beginning in 2015, he is the host of the comedy news quiz series Because News on CBC Radio One.

Awards
Crawford was the recipient of the Tim Sims Encouragement Fund Award in 1998. He was nominated four times for a Gemini Award, which he won in December 2004 for his work on The Gavin Crawford Show (he was nominated twice in 2004, also for This Hour Has 22 Minutes). His comedy special Gavin Crawford's Wild West, which aired on CBC Television in 2013, garnered several Canadian Screen Award nominations at the 2nd Canadian Screen Awards, including a Best Actor in a Comedy Program or Series nod for Crawford.

Personal life
Crawford is openly gay. He lives in Toronto.

Theatre 
 Rope Enough by Sky Gilbert as Ichabod Malframe, Buddies in Bad Times 2005
 Bad Acting Teachers by Sky Gilbert as Reginald Architruc, Buddies in Bad Times 2006
 A Few Brittle Leaves by Sky Gilbert as Viola Pie, Buddies in Bad Times 2013

References

External links 
 
 

1971 births
Male actors from Alberta
Canadian male film actors
Canadian male stage actors
Canadian male television actors
Canadian television personalities
Canadian gay actors
Gay comedians
Canadian Screen Award winners
Canadian LGBT broadcasters
Living people
People from Taber, Alberta
This Hour Has 22 Minutes
University of British Columbia alumni
Canadian sketch comedians
CBC Radio hosts
Canadian impressionists (entertainers)
Canadian male comedians
20th-century Canadian comedians
21st-century Canadian comedians
Comedians from Alberta
Canadian Comedy Award winners
Canadian LGBT comedians
21st-century Canadian LGBT people
20th-century Canadian LGBT people